Piotrków Drugi  is a village in the administrative district of Gmina Jabłonna, within Lublin County, Lublin Voivodeship, in eastern Poland.

The village has a population of 770.

References

Villages in Lublin County